Desus & Mero is an American television late-night talk show hosted by comedians Desus Nice and The Kid Mero. The show aired from February 2019 to June 2022 on the premium cable and streaming service Showtime.

History 
Desus & Mero is the third series co-hosted by the pair, following the 2014 Complex TV web series Desus vs. Mero, and the 2016 Viceland television and web series Desus & Mero.

Production

Development 
In June 2018, Showtime announced they had ordered a half-hour late night series starring Desus and Mero, to be the network's first late night show ever. Desus and Mero stated that the increased budget would allow the show to have more pre-recorded sketches, a research team, and an upgraded set. They also hired a writer's room with the following writers: Mike Pielocik, Josh Gondelman, Claire Friedman, Ziwe Fumudoh, Robert Kornhauser, and Heben Nigatu.

Release 
The series debuted February 21, 2019. Congresswoman Alexandria Ocasio-Cortez was their first guest. On April 21, 2019, it was announced that Desus & Mero would expand to air two nights per week, on Mondays and Thursdays. On November 21, 2019, the same day as the airing of season one's final episode, Showtime announced the renewal of the show for a second season.

Due to the COVID-19 pandemic, the show went on temporary hiatus, but returned on March 30 in a teleconferencing format from Baker and Martinez's respective homes. In September 2020, the show's Twitter announced that the show had been renewed for a third season, which set to premiere on January 31, 2021.

In August 2021, Showtime renewed the series for a fourth season.

On July 18, 2022, Showtime confirmed that the show had concluded with its June 23 episode, as the two co-hosts had decided to pursue "separate creative endeavors moving forward".

Episodes

Season 1 (2019)

Season 2 (2020)

Season 3 (2021)

Season 4 (2022)

Critical reception
Desus & Mero received positive reviews. Daniel D'addario wrote for Variety magazine: "Their perspective, in a sea of late-night shows all modeled on John Oliver's studiousness, feels genuinely new. And Desus and Mero showed enough comic resourcefulness, and enough enthusiasm and warmth, throughout their broadcast to make clear it's worth watching no matter who guests." Writing for Entertainment Weekly, Kristen Baldwin gave the show a B+ and stated in the review: "The initial outing revealed a few weaknesses in the new format, but it retained the humor, point of view, and boisterous energy that makes Desus and Mero an essential late-night addition." Marc Silver wrote for The Washington Post, "With their own wit and the help of veterans from the Stephen Colbert and John Oliver late-night shows, they bring a fresh and funny take and add all-too-rarely heard Black and Latino perspectives."

Accolades 
Hosts Desus and Mero received a 2019 Webby Special Achievement Award for their talk show.

Awards and nominations

Notes

References

External links
 Desus & Mero  on Showtime
 

2019 American television series debuts
2022 American television series endings
2010s American television talk shows
2020s American television talk shows
2010s American late-night television series
2020s American late-night television series
Showtime (TV network) original programming
Television series reboots